is a Japanese manga series written and illustrated by Tadahiro Miura. The manga was serialized in Shueisha's Weekly Shōnen Jump magazine from February 2016 to June 2020, and collected into twenty-four tankōbon volumes.

In North America, Seven Seas Entertainment publishes the series for an English-language release under its Ghost Ship imprint with the first volume being released in May 2018. An anime television series adaptation by Xebec aired from July to September 2018.

Plot 
The series follows the life of the luckless and homeless high school student Kogarashi Fuyuzora. In his search for a home, he is introduced to the Yuragi Inn, a cheap boarding house and former hot springs inn. The reason the rent is so cheap is because it is haunted by the beautiful ghost spirit Yuuna whose corpse was discovered at the inn. Kogarashi then helps Yuuna with her unfinished business, all while discovering the supernatural secrets of the rest of the female tenants.

Characters

A powerful psychic who can vanquish his foes easily. Prior to the start of the story, he was homeless before coming to the Yuragi Inn. As a child, he often lived in orphanages. Much to his chagrin, his body was susceptible to being easily possessed by spirits, causing misfortune in his childhood. However, he was able to become physically and spiritually stronger after training under , a descendant of the  family. He is the only known living person that can use the abilities of the Yatahagane, but also inheriting the weaknesses of the Yatahagane. Kogarashi is extremely popular with the females around him with almost all of the female characters being a love interest of his.

She is a ghost who is bound to the Yuragi Inn. She has no recollection of her life when she was alive and asks for Kogarashi's assistance in helping her discover who she was, developing an attachment to him in the process. In the manga however, she was revealed to be a clone made from Mahoro Tenko and a legendary monster Garandō. She is the legendary Genryūsai Tenko, a powerful warrior known for psychic prowess. She later uses her skills after she unlocks her memories, but retained her Yūna identity, and her bound ghost status was weakened enough to roam at the inn by night. At the end of the series she stays bound to the world of the living despite clearing her regrets due to wanting to stay with Kogarashi whom she marries soon after.

A ninja from a clan of demon-slaying ninjas. She is dedicated to her duty as a ninja, spending time going on missions to destroy harmful supernatural creatures. Although she too has developed feelings towards Kogarashi, she chooses to bottle them up for her own pride and her intent on not getting in the way of the other girls who love Kogarashi. After she unlocked her ultimate spiritual armor, she confesses her love.

The cousin of Sagiri who is also a ninja. She considers herself as a rival to Sagiri and wants to surpass her one day. She met Kogarashi and forced him to pretend to be her boyfriend to unnerve Sagiri. Eventually, she would move into the Yuragi Inn after being infatuated with Kogarashi's heroism as well as assisting Sagiri in her missions. In later chapters she eventually confessed and was rejected by Kogarashi (similar to Karura Hiogi), however that event only made her feelings stronger, making her bolder in her further pursuit of him. She also unlocked her ultimate ability.

Sagiri and Hibari's friend and fellow Ninja. She uses her communication via telepathy and her paper shikigami.

A timid girl who acts as a vessel for a cat god. She exhibits catlike behavior as well as having cat ears and a tail when she is possessed by it. Through their bond, she is able to call on its power whenever it is needed, and she can also warp in more cat gods through her body, but at the cost of her cat abilities temporarily.

A zashiki-warashi who is the caretaker of the Yuragi Inn. She has the power to manipulate the fortune of others, but she rarely uses it because of its potential consequences. She also enters middle school thanks to Tsutomu, her childhood friend turned principal. She hides the fact that she enters school, until her cover was blown.

An oni who works as a manga author. She loves to drink alcohol, and as she becomes more intoxicated, her power as an oni grows, but not always needed to drink it, her clan absorb the alcohol. She is formerly a member of the  family, one of the three great families in Japan, but left the clan and pursued her passions. She is quite energetic, but an airhead.

A girl who befriends Kogarashi after meeting him during the first day of high school. She is also a popular girl at school, known for her beauty. She later develops feelings for Kogarashi when he shows to be a dependable person. She also befriends Yuuna, but is initially unable to see her due to a lack of supernatural powers, thus relying on written forms of communication to talk to her. When Koyuzu possesses her, she develops her ghost vision, allowing her to see Yuuna.

Oboro moves into the Yuragi Inn after being impressed by Kogarashi's strong physical and spiritual prowess. Her initial motivation to moving in was to preserve her family's bloodline by attempting to seduce Kogarashi. As she continues on this plan and interacting with the fellow tenants though, she begins to display emotion and genuine romantic feelings towards him. Oboro also has a younger half-brother named , who is the head of the Ryuuga clan and the current Black Dragon God.

A tengu whose family is affiliated with the Yoinozaka family. She fell in love with Kogarashi when he stopped a conflict between the Yoinozaka and the  family. Ever since then, she dedicated her time to finding Kogarashi. After rediscovering him, she abducts him to try and force him to marry her through a ritual, which ends in failure. After being rejected by Kogarashi, she strives to make amends with him for what she had done. Hiōgi tries her best to capture Kogarashi's heart as her clairvoyance ability shows he still harbors feelings for her. Hiōgi also has a nue for best friend named , who is always looking to challenge the strongest people she meets in combat.

A tanuki who had been secretly stalking Chisaki in order to create the perfect human disguise. After being discovered by Chisaki, Kogarashi, and Yuuna, she eventually starts living in the Yuragi Inn after living alone for some time. She can create leaf charms that can transform itself or other objects into new forms, but terrible on human transformation herself, a fact that she cannot go live like other tanukis who lives in human world. She can also possess other people, especially Chisaki. She was mature enough to live on her own, according to her race's rules, as tanukis were mature at a year old, she's a 10 year old tanuki.

A young kitsune who is another member of Tenko clan, but on the branch family. Like Koyuzu, she can create leaf charms that can transform itself or other objects into new forms. Miria though can live in the human world as she has mastered human transformation. She initially ventured to the Yuragi Inn just to find out if the rumor of Genryūsai Tenko was there, and was surprised to find it in Yuuna. Miria ends up enjoying her time at the Inn and joins the other girls in their fun, while creating a friendly rivalry with Koyuzu.

Shion Todoroki

Publication 
The manga series is written and illustrated by Tadahiro Miura. It began serialization in Shueisha's 10th issue of the shōnen manga anthology Weekly Shōnen Jump on February 8, 2016. In May 2020, in the 26th issue of Weekly Shōnen Jump, it was announced that the series would reach its climax in the 27th issue, published on June 8, 2020. A special chapter was published in the summer issue of Jump Giga on July 27, 2020. Shueisha has compiled its chapters into twenty-four individual tankōbon volumes, released from June 3, 2016 to December 4, 2020. In North America, the series has been licensed in English by Seven Seas Entertainment, who released the first volume under its Ghost Ship imprint on May 8, 2018.

Volume list

Media

Anime 

An anime adaptation of the manga was announced in the 50th issue of Weekly Shōnen Jump magazine in November 2017, later revealed to be a television series. The anime is directed by Tsuyoshi Nagasawa at Xebec, with Hideaki Koyasu handled series composition, Kyoko Taketani designed the characters, Jin Aketagawa handled sound direction and Tomoki Kikuya composed the music. The opening theme is  performed by Luna Haruna, while the ending theme song is "Happen" performed by cast members Miyuri Shimabukuro, Eri Suzuki, and Rie Takahashi. It aired from July 14 to September 29, 2018 and broadcast on BS11 and Tokyo MX. The series is licensed in North America by Aniplex of America and simulcast on Crunchyroll. The series ran for 12 episodes. MVM Entertainment acquired the series for distribution in the UK and Ireland.

An OVA episode was bundled with the manga's 11th volume which was released on July 4, 2018. A second OVA episode was bundled with the manga's 12th volume which was released on October 4, 2018. A third OVA episode was bundled with the manga's 13th volume which was released on December 4, 2018. A two-episode OVA produced by Signal.MD was bundled with the manga's 24th volume, which was released on December 4, 2020.

Video games 
A video game by FuRyu titled  was released for PlayStation 4 on November 15, 2018. A mobile phone game titled  began service in April 2019 and ended service on December 25, 2019.

Reception

Controversy
The series attracted controversy in Japan when a "character poll" featuring "sexualized" images ran in a magazine whose readers include children. Lawyer Keiko Ōta urged parents to not let their sons read the magazine, saying that "depicting sexual harassment as pleasure is a problem." A gender studies professor at Osaku University also weighed in on the matter saying that young boys are learning to see females as sexual objects. Those in support of the magazine's images said that seeing erotic images is a necessary part of growth into adulthood. Others which include lawyer Yamato Satō expressed concerns about excessive censorship. Sculptor and manga artist Megumi Igarashi criticized the hype citing "The ego of parents who want their children to remain innocent forever." Manga artist Tatsuya Egawa also criticized the hype by comparing the images to the series Harenchi Gakuen while calling those who want to ban the content "sadly stupid".

Critical commentary
Rebecca Silverman of Anime News Network gave the first manga volume an overall "B" rating citing the good relationship forming between Yuuna and Kogarashi, some funny moments, and the attractive artwork. She was critical about the side characters being "mostly just annoying", and "dated tropes" that "drag things down". Sean Gaffney from "A case suitable for Treatment" gave the first manga volume a favorable review calling the main male character a “confident Jump hero in the Luffy/Soma tradition". Gaffney noted a-lot of similarities to the series To Love Ru other than this "nice change" from a passive male character, and stated that he liked the way Yuuna was "translated and adapted". Stig Høgset from "THEM Anime Reviews" reviewed the anime adaptation and gave it a 4/5 star rating saying that it was "old-school" for "both good and bad". Høgset said in his review that he liked the anime for its "unassuming, but still clearly noticeable character progression as more quiet slice-of-lives". He was critical though, about the mixed bag of comedy, and the main character's harassment of "a whole lot of women" even if it was unintentional. Høgset in the end said that while the series rates a "weak 4" the anime adaptation of Yuuna and the Haunted Hot Springs's "heart more than makes up for its shortcomings".

See also 
 List of harem anime and manga

Notes

References

External links 
  
  
 
 

Anime series based on manga
Aniplex franchises
Comedy anime and manga
Harem anime and manga
IG Port franchises
Paranormal romance comics
Seven Seas Entertainment titles
Shueisha franchises
Shueisha manga
Shōnen manga
Signal.MD
Supernatural anime and manga
Television series about ghosts
Xebec (studio)
Yōkai in anime and manga